Janke is a name of Germanic origin. 

This name is popular in countries speaking Dutch or Afrikaans, such as The Netherlands and South Africa. As a first name, it is usually attributed to a woman in South Africa. (This being due to a TV series aired in the 1990s where one of the main female protagonists was named Janke). It may also appear as a male first name amongst other families with ties to Germanic background.  Spelling variations include Jancke, Jankhe, and (rarely) Janckhe. The name is derived from the Dutch male name Jan (a form of John or Johan), and features the suffix "-ke", which makes it a pet name, almost meaning "Baby Jan".

People with the surname Janke include:

Barbara Janke (born 1947), British teacher and politician
Curt W. Janke (1892–1975), American politician
Dennis Janke (born 1950), American comic book artist
Dexter Janke (born 1992), Canadian football defensive back
Fred Janke (1917–2009), American football player, business executive and politician
Gabriele Janke (born 1956), German fencer
Grant Janke (born  1990), South African rugby union player
Janusz Janke (born 1966), Polish diplomat
Karin Janke (born 1963), retired German sprinter
Kleber Janke (born 1988), Brazilian footballer
Terri Janke, Wuthathi/Meriam Indigenous lawyer
Toni Janke, Australian soul singer

See also
Janke Nunatak, Antarctica
Janke Township, Logan County, North Dakota, United States

German-language surnames